A cross is a geometrical figure consisting of two intersecting lines or bars, usually perpendicular to each other. The lines usually run vertically and horizontally. A cross of oblique lines, in the shape of the Latin letter X, is termed a saltire in heraldic terminology.

The cross has been widely recognized as a symbol of Christianity from an early period. Before then, it was a pagan religious symbol throughout Europe and western Asia. The effigy of a man hanging on a cross was set up in the fields to protect the crops. It often appeared in conjunction with the female-genital circle or oval, to signify the sacred marriage, as in Egyptian amulet Nefer with male cross and female orb, considered as an amulet of blessedness, a charm of sexual harmony.

Name   
The word cross is recorded in 11th-century Old English as cros, exclusively for the instrument of Christ's crucifixion, replacing the native Old English word rood. The word's history is complicated; it appears to have entered English from Old Irish, possibly via Old Norse, ultimately from the Latin  (or its accusative  and its genitive ), "stake, cross". The English verb to cross arises from the noun , first in the sense "to make the sign of the cross"; the generic meaning "to intersect" develops in the 15th century. The Latin word was influenced by popular etymology by a native Germanic word reconstructed as *krukjo (English crook, Old English , Old Norse , Old High German ). This word, by conflation with Latin , gave rise to Old French  (modern French ), the term for a shepherd's crook, adopted in English as crosier.

Latin  referred to the gibbet where criminals were executed, a stake or pole, with or without , on which the condemned were impaled or hanged, but more particularly a cross or the pole of a carriage. The derived verb  means "to put to death on the cross" or, more frequently, "to put to the rack, to torture, torment", especially in reference to mental troubles. 
  In the Roman world,  replaced  as the name of some cross-like instruments for lethal and temporary punishment, ranging from a forked cross to a gibbet or gallows.

The field of etymology is of no help in any effort to trace a supposed original meaning of crux. A crux can be of various shapes: from a single beam used for impaling or suspending to the various composite kinds of cross made from more beams than one.

From the first century BC, it is used to indicate an instrument used in executions. The Greek word is used in descriptions in antiquity of the execution cross, which indicate that its normal shape was similar to the Greek letter tau (Τ).

History

Pre-Christian

Due to the simplicity of the design (two intersecting lines), cross-shaped incisions make their appearance from deep prehistory; as petroglyphs in European cult caves, dating back to the beginning of the Upper Paleolithic, and throughout prehistory to the Iron Age.
Also of prehistoric age are numerous variants of the simple cross mark, including the crux gammata with curving or angular lines, and the Egyptian crux ansata with a loop.

Speculation has associated the cross symbol – even in the prehistoric period – with astronomical or cosmological symbology involving 
"four elements" (Chevalier, 1997) or the cardinal points, or the unity of a vertical axis mundi or celestial pole with the horizontal world (Koch, 1955). Speculation of this kind became especially popular in the mid- to late-19th century in the context of comparative mythology seeking to tie Christian mythology to ancient cosmological myths. Influential works in this vein included 
G. de Mortillet (1866), L. Müller (1865), W. W. Blake (1888), Ansault (1891), etc.

In the European Bronze Age the cross symbol appeared to carry a religious meaning, perhaps as a symbol of consecration, especially pertaining to burial.

The cross sign occurs trivially in tally marks, and develops into a number symbol independently in the Roman numerals (X "ten"), the Chinese rod numerals (十 "ten") and the Brahmi numerals ("four", whence the numeral 4).

In the Phoenician alphabet and derived scripts, the cross symbol represented the phoneme /t/, i.e. the letter taw, which is the historical predecessor of Latin T. The letter name taw means "mark", presumably continuing the Egyptian hieroglyph  "two crossed sticks" (Gardiner Z9).

Christian

The shape of the cross (crux, stauros "stake, gibbet"), as represented by the letter T, came to be used as a "seal" or symbol of Early Christianity by the 2nd century. Clement of Alexandria in the early 3rd century calls it  ("the Lord's sign") he repeats the idea, current as early as the Epistle of Barnabas, that the number 318 (in Greek numerals, ΤΙΗ) in Genesis 14:14 was a foreshadowing (a "type") of the cross (the letter Tau) and of Jesus (the letters Iota Eta). Clement's contemporary Tertullian rejects the accusation that Christians are  crucis religiosi (i.e. "adorers of the gibbet"), and returns the accusation by likening the worship of pagan idols to the worship of poles or stakes. 
In his book De Corona, written in 204, Tertullian tells how it was already a tradition for Christians to trace repeatedly on their foreheads the sign of the cross.

While early Christians used the T-shape to represent the cross in writing and gesture, the use of the Greek cross and Latin cross, i.e. crosses with intersecting beams, appears in Christian art towards the end of Late Antiquity. An early example of the cruciform halo, used to identify Christ in paintings, is found in the Miracles of the Loaves and Fishes mosaic of Sant'Apollinare Nuovo, Ravenna (6th century). 
The Patriarchal cross, a Latin cross with an additional horizontal bar, first appears in the 10th century.
A wide variation of cross symbols is introduced for the purposes of heraldry beginning in the age of the Crusades.

Marks and graphemes 

The cross mark is used to mark a position, or as a check mark, but also to mark deletion.
Derived from Greek Chi are the Latin letter X, Cyrillic Kha and possibly runic Gyfu.

Egyptian hieroglyphs involving cross shapes include  ankh "life",  ndj "protect" and nfr "good; pleasant, beautiful".

Sumerian cuneiform had a simple cross-shaped character, consisting of a horizontal and a vertical wedge (𒈦), read as maš "tax, yield, interest"; the superposition of two diagonal wedges results in a decussate cross (𒉽), read as pap "first, pre-eminent" (the superposition of these two types of crosses results in the eight-pointed star used as the sign for "sky" or "deity" (𒀭), DINGIR).
The cuneiform script has other, more complex, cruciform characters, consisting of an arrangement of boxes or the fourfold arrangement of other characters, including the archaic cuneiform characters LAK-210, LAK-276, LAK-278, LAK-617 and the classical sign EZEN (𒂡).

Phoenician tāw is still cross-shaped in Paleo-Hebrew alphabet and in some Old Italic scripts (Raetic and Lepontic), and its descendant T becomes again cross-shaped in the Latin minuscule t. 
The plus sign (+) is derived from Latin t via a simplification of a ligature for et "and" (introduced by Johannes Widmann in the late 15th century).

The letter Aleph is cross-shaped in Aramaic and paleo-Hebrew.

Egyptian hieroglyphs with cross-shapes include Gardiner Z9 – Z11 ("crossed sticks", "crossed planks").

Other, unrelated cross-shaped letters include Brahmi ka (predecessor of the Devanagari letter क) and Old Turkic (Orkhon) d² and Old Hungarian b, and Katakana ナ na and メme.

The multiplication sign (×), often attributed to William Oughtred (who first used it in an appendix to the 1618 edition of John Napier's Descriptio) apparently had been in occasional use since the mid 16th century.

Other typographical symbols resembling crosses include the dagger or obelus (†), 
the Chinese (十, Kangxi radical 24) and Roman (X ten).

Unicode has a variety of cross symbols in the "Dingbat" block (U+2700–U+27BF) : 
✕ ✖ ✗ ✘ ✙ ✚ ✛ ✜ ✝ ✞ ✟ ✠ ✢ ✣ ✤ ✥
The Miscellaneous Symbols block (U+2626 to U+262F) adds three specific Christian cross variants, viz. the Patriarchal cross (☦), Cross of Lorraine (☨) and Cross potent (☩, mistakenly labeled a "Cross of Jerusalem").

Emblems 

The following is a list of cross symbols, except for variants of the Christian cross and Heraldic crosses, for which see the dedicated lists at Christian cross variants and Crosses in heraldry, respectively.

As a design element

Physical gestures 
Cross shapes are made by a variety of physical gestures. Crossing the fingers of one hand is a common invocation of the symbol. The sign of the cross associated with Christian genuflection is made with one hand: in Eastern Orthodox tradition the sequence is head-heart-right shoulder-left shoulder, while in Oriental Orthodox, Catholic and Anglican tradition the sequence is head-heart-left-right.

Crossing the index fingers of both hands represents and a charm against evil in European folklore. Other gestures involving more than one hand include the "cross my heart" movement associated with making a promise and the Tau shape of the referee's "time out" hand signal.

In Chinese-speaking cultures, crossed index fingers represent the number 10.

References

 Chevalier, Jean (1997). The Penguin Dictionary of Symbols. Penguin .
 Drury, Nevill (1985). Dictionary of Mysticism and the Occult. Harper & Row. .
 Koch, Rudolf (1955). The Book of Signs. Dover, NY. .
 Webber, F. R. (1927, rev. 1938). Church Symbolism: an explanation of the more important symbols of the Old and New Testament, the primitive, the mediaeval and the modern church. Cleveland, OH. .

External links

 Seiyaku.com, all Crosses—probably the largest collection on the Internet
 Variations of Crosses - Images and Meanings
 Cross & Crucifix—Glossary: Forms and Topics
 Nasrani.net, Indian Cross
 The Christian Cross of Jesus Christ: Symbols of Christianity, Images, Designs and representations of it as objects of devotion

 
Petroglyphs
Religious symbols